The following lists events that happened during 1975 in Australia.

Incumbents

Monarch – Elizabeth II
Governor-General – Sir John Kerr
Prime Minister – Gough Whitlam (until 11 November), then Malcolm Fraser
Deputy Prime Minister – Jim Cairns (until 2 July), then Frank Crean (until 11 November), then Doug Anthony
Opposition Leader –  Billy Snedden (until 21 March), then Malcolm Fraser (until 11 November), then Gough Whitlam
Chief Justice – Sir Garfield Barwick

State and Territory Leaders
Premier of New South Wales – Sir Robert Askin (until 3 January), then Tom Lewis
Opposition Leader – Neville Wran
Premier of Queensland – Joh Bjelke-Petersen
Opposition Leader – Tom Burns
Premier of South Australia – Don Dunstan
Opposition Leader – Bruce Eastick (until 24 July), then David Tonkin
Premier of Tasmania – Eric Reece (until 31 March), then Bill Neilson
Opposition Leader – Max Bingham
Premier of Victoria – Rupert Hamer
Opposition Leader – Clyde Holding
Premier of Western Australia – Sir Charles Court
Opposition Leader – John Tonkin
Majority Leader of the Northern Territory – Goff Letts

Governors and Administrators
Governor of New South Wales – Sir Roden Cutler
Governor of Queensland – Sir Colin Hannah
Governor of South Australia – Sir Mark Oliphant 
Governor of Tasmania – Sir Stanley Burbury
Governor of Victoria – Sir Henry Winneke
Governor of Western Australia – Sir Hughie Edwards (until 2 April), then Sir Wallace Kyle (from 24 November)
Administrator of Norfolk Island – Edward Pickerd (until 31 August), then Charles Buffett
Administrator of the Northern Territory – Jock Nelson (until 12 November)
High Commissioner of Papua New Guinea – Tom Critchley (until 16 September)

Events

January
 5 January – Tasman Bridge disaster: The Tasman Bridge in Hobart is struck by the ore carrier MV Lake Illawarra. The bridge partially collapses onto the vessel, which sinks. Seven crew and five motorists are killed.
 7 January – An Executive Council Minute authorising the raising of a "temporary loan" of US$4,000 million for 20 years is reversed before it becomes public knowledge.  The move to bypass the Loans Council – to become known as the "Loans Affair" – had been initiated a month earlier by several Labor Ministers without consulting Cabinet.
 19 January – 2JJ, the predecessor of youth radio Triple J, commences broadcasting in Sydney.
 26 January – The Workers' Party is launched at a banquet at the Sydney Opera House.  The WP is libertarian in principle, demanding less government intervention, as well as being virulently anti-Socialist.  The name is subsequently changed to the Progress Party in 1977.

February
 9 February – Lionel Murphy resigns to become a High Court judge (a move for which Garfield Barwick's appointment had set a precedent).  
 11 February – New South Wales Premier Tom Lewis decides to replace Lionel Murphy in the Senate with a non-Labor nominee.  Cabinet unanimously endorses his decision.  Albury's 77-year-old mayor, Cleaver Bunton, is selected, thus reducing Labor to 28 in the Senate.  The move is seen as breaking constitutional convention and was against the advice of senior Liberals and most Premiers.
 27 February – Prime Minister Gough Whitlam's failure to support Speaker Jim Cope in a ruling involving Clyde Cameron (Hindmarsh) led to the Speaker's resignation and his replacement by Gordon Scholes.  Cope had been having difficulty with the Opposition's increasing larrikinism.

March
 18 March – The Victorian Government appoints the Beach Board of Inquiry to report on allegations of misconduct against the police force.
 21 March – Malcolm Fraser replaces Billy Snedden as leader of the Liberal Party of Australia, winning the party room ballot 37:27.  Phillip Lynch retains the deputy leadership.

April
 8 April – After 21 hours of bitter debate in the Victorian Legislative Assembly, a Bill to abolish the death penalty is passed 36:30, with 5 abstentions.  To this end, Labor Council leader J. Galbally had brought in 21 private members Bills in some 15 years.  The abolition Bill must now pass the Legislative Council where lengthy debate and an even closer vote is expected.
 25 April – The Australian Embassy in South Vietnam is closed and staff evacuated prior to the Fall of Saigon.

May
 20 May – The Executive Council revokes approval it had given on 28 January for a US$2,000 million overseas loan.  Henceforth, all negotiations are to be conducted through the Treasury.

June
 5 June – Lance Barnard's resignation to become Ambassador to Sweden leads to a reorganisation of the Federal Ministry.  Social Security Minister Bill Hayden (Ipswich) replaces Jim Cairns as Treasurer, and Cameron is demoted from the Labour and Immigration Ministry to Science and Consumer Affairs (amid his own and union protests).
 15 June – The South Australian Australian Labor Party conference gives Prime Minister Gough Whitlam a mixed reception.  The Australian Workers' Union, in particular, is offended by his recent demotion of Clyde Cameron, for decades a leading figure in South Australia's Labor and Industrial Affairs.
 28 June – The 1975 Bass by-election is held.  Malcolm Fraser and Gough Whitlam campaign against each other for the first time as leaders.  A swing of about 16% against the Australian Labor Party gives the seat to the Liberal candidate Kevin Newman, and the Opposition sees this as the green light for its strategy of forcing a second premature election.
 30 June – Queensland Senator Bert Milliner dies, leaving a Senate vacancy.  The filling of this vacancy and the controversy surrounding it becomes one of the key events of the 1975 Australian constitutional crisis.

July
 1 July – Medibank is introduced, Australia Post and Telecom are formed from the Postmaster-General's Department (PMG).
 2 July – Prime Minister Gough Whitlam has Jim Cairns' commission as Environment Minister terminated for misleading Parliament.  Mr Cairns had denied having written a secret letter to a loans broker in March, but a signed letter was produced in June.
 4 July – Sydney newspaper publisher Juanita Nielsen disappears from her Kings Cross home where she published attacks on inner-city development.  Edward Trigg and Shayne Martin-Simmonds are later found guilty of conspiring to murder her.

September
 3 September – Convention is breached when the Queensland Parliament rejects Australian Labor Party nominee Mal Colston to replace the deceased Senator Bert Milliner, choosing instead Pat Field (automatically expelled for having nominated against the endorsed candidate.
 16 September – Papua New Guinea gains its independence from Australia.
 20 September – Thirteen miners are killed in an underground coal mine explosion at the Kianga Mine at Moura, Queensland.

October
 1 October – Senator Albert Field (now an Independent) is granted a month's leave of absence while his eligibility to take his seat is tested in the High Court of Australia, sitting as a Court of Disputed Returns.  There has been doubting as to whether he resigned in the correct way from the Public Service at the time he was appointed.
 8 October – Prime Minister Gough Whitlam denied in Parliament that any of his senior ministers were still involved in trying to raise overseas loans in defiance of the 20 May revocation.  Press reports based on information from the loan intermediary, Tirath Khemlani, suggest that Rex Connor is still involved.
 10 October – The High Court of Australia upholds the validity of the territorial Senators legislation.  In any half-Senate election, four senators, plus replacements for Bunton and Field, would take their places in the Senate at once, thus giving Labor the chance to win back control there.
 15 October – At a Brisbane Chamber of Commerce annual luncheon, Queensland Governor Sir Colin Hannah associated himself with the criticism of the Federal Government.  In the ensuing row, Prime Minister Gough Whitlam persuades Queen Elizabeth II to revoke his dormant commission to act as Governor-General.
 16 October – The Balibo Five are killed by Indonesian troops in Portuguese Timor.

November
 11 November – 1975 Australian constitutional crisis: The Governor-General, Sir John Kerr, dismisses the government of Gough Whitlam. Malcolm Fraser is installed as caretaker Prime Minister.
 19 November – Two staff members of the Queensland Premier's Department are injured when they open a letter-bomb addressed to the Premier Joh Bjelke-Petersen.

December
 8 December – 4ZZZ independent community radio station launches in Brisbane.
 9 December – New South Wales Country Party Leader Sir Charles Cutler retires and Deputy Leader Leon Punch replaces him with J.C. Bruxner as his deputy.
 13 December – 
The 1975 Australian federal election is held.  After a bitter campaign in which Labor tried to keep constitutional matters to the fore and the Coalition concentrated on inflation, unemployment and Labor's errors in office, the Fraser Government is confirmed in power, securing 54% of the vote, 91 of the 127 House seats, and 35 Senate seats.
The Victorian Government forms a committee to examine some of the recommendations from the Beach Board of Inquiry.
 25 December – Fifteen persons are killed in an arson attack at the Savoy Hotel in Kings Cross, New South Wales.
 Scientist John Cornforth is announced as Australian of the Year.

Science and technology
John Cornforth shares the Nobel Prize for Chemistry

Arts and literature

 Kevin Connor wins the Archibald Prize with his portrait of The Hon Sir Frank Kitto, KBE
 Xavier Herbert's novel Poor Fellow My Country wins the Miles Franklin Award

Film
 Picnic at Hanging Rock, directed by Peter Weir, is released

Television
 1 March – "C-Day."  Full-time colour broadcasting is launched.
 April – Graham Kennedy said the crow call "Fuuuuuuuuuuuuck!" during a live ad on The Graham Kennedy Show. The studio operators complied, and the show immediately pulled the plug and went to a black screen saying the network had "technical difficulties". In Sydney, the show went to a commercial break and Kennedy never came back, with Bert Newton remaining during the airtime. The same happened in Adelaide, with the exception that it was succeeded by Don Lane starting the host his variety show with Newton. Kennedy was immediately fired and banned for life from GTV-9.

Sport
 16 March – Australia is represented by twelve long-distance runners (eight men, four women) at the third IAAF World Cross Country Championships in Rabat, Morocco. Bill Scott is Australia's best finisher, claiming the 22nd spot (36:28.0) in the race over 12 kilometres.
 9 August – John Farrington wins his fourth men's national marathon title, clocking 2:17:20 in Point Cook.
 23 August: 
 Glenelg kick the all-time record score for a major Australian football competition, kicking 49.23 (317) to Central District's 11.13 (79). Fred Phillis kicked eighteen goals and Peter Carey eight.
 Eastern Suburbs set a record NSWRL/ARL/NRL winning streak of their last nineteen home-and-away games before losing the major semi-final.
 20 September – Minor premiers Eastern Suburbs set a record NSWRL Grand Final winning margin, beating St. George 38 points to nil. South Sydney finish in last position, claiming the wooden spoon.
 27 September – North Melbourne become the last of the then-extant VFL clubs to win a premiership, beating Hawthorn 19.8 (122) to 9.13 (67) in the 1975 VFL Grand Final.
 Think Big wins the Melbourne Cup Jockey Harry White.
 Western Australia wins the Sheffield Shield
 Kialoa takes line honours in the Sydney to Hobart Yacht Race. Rampage is the handicap winner
 Czechoslovakia defeats Australia 3–0 in the Federation Cup

Births
 2 January – Chris Cheney, singer-songwriter, guitarist and producer
 19 January – Natalie Cook, beach volleyball player
 4 February – Natalie Imbruglia, singer and actor
 7 March – Leon Dunne, swimmer
 13 March – Matt Sing, rugby league player 
 19 March – Matthew Richardson, footballer and sportscaster
 19 April – Jason Gillespie, cricketer
 13 May – Nathan Green, golfer
 21 May – Anthony Mundine, rugby league footballer and boxer
 27 May – Michael Hussey, cricketer
 7 June – Leigh Colbert, footballer
 9 June – Andrew Symonds, cricketer
 23 June
 Jane Jamieson, track and field athlete
 Markus Zusak, novelist
 2 July – Daniel Kowalski, swimmer
 4 July – Scott Major, actor and director 
 5 July – Kip Gamblin, actor  
 7 July – Michael Voss, Australian footballer and coach
 17 July – Loretta Harrop, triathlete
 7 August 
 Megan Gale, model
 David Matthew Hicks, prisoner at Guantánamo Bay, convicted of "providing material support for terrorism"
 12 August – Taryn Woods, water polo player
 21 August – Simon Katich, cricketer
 25 August – Petria Thomas, swimmer
 1 September – Natalie Bassingthwaighte, singer and actor
 16 September – Shannon Noll, singer 
 18 September – Don Hany, actor
 25 September – Scott Westcott, long-distance runner
 28 September – Stuart Clark, cricketer
 9 October – Mark Viduka, football (soccer) player
 23 October – Phillip Gillespie, cricket umpire
 31 October
 Carla Boyd, basketball player
 Jagan Hames, track and field athlete

 December 18 – SIA, Australian singer and songwriter

Deaths
 30 April – Aubrey Abbott, politician and administrator of the Northern Territory (b. 1886)
 30 June – Bert Milliner, Queensland politician (b. 1911)
 14 August – Percy Cerutty – athletics coach (b. 1895)
 27 September – Jack Lang, 23rd Premier of New South Wales (b. 1876)
 6 November – Annette Kellerman, swimmer, actress, and author (b. 1887)

See also
 1975 in Australian television
 List of Australian films of 1975

References

 
Australia
Years of the 20th century in Australia